Chucking may refer to:

Throwing (cricket), the act of illegally bowling in cricket
Vomiting
Chucking (musical technique)  e.g. with string instruments, the muting of the chord, see Chop chord
Chucking (workpiece on machine tools)  e.g. on screw-making machines, see Screw machine#Automatic chucking_machine